William Honywood (c. 1759 – 9 February 1818) was a British soldier and Whig politician who sat in the House of Commons from 1806 to 1812.

Honeywood was the son of William Honywood and his wife Elizabeth Clark of Wallingford. He served in the American War.

Honywood was elected as a Member of Parliament (MP) for Kent at the 1806 general election and held the seat until the 1812 general election, which he did not contest.

In 1809, Honywood inherited the Marks Hall estate from his half-uncle Filmer Honywood, also a Member of Parliament.

Honywood married Mary Brockman. He died at his home in Charles Street, Berkeley Square, London aged 59. Their son William Philip was also MP for Kent, and inherited the Marks Hall estate.

References

External links 

1750s births
1818 deaths
Whig (British political party) MPs for English constituencies
Members of the Parliament of the United Kingdom for English constituencies
UK MPs 1806–1807
UK MPs 1807–1812
British Army personnel of the American Revolutionary War